Harold Murray may refer to:
H. J. R. Murray (Harold James Ruthven Murray), educationalist and historian
J. Harold Murray, American baritone singer and actor
Harold Murray (bowls), Australian lawn bowls player

See also
Harry Murray (disambiguation)